Nealy Cameron Martin (born April 22, 1998) is an American professional soccer player who plays as a defender for National Women's Soccer League club NJ/NY Gotham FC.

Club career
Born in Birmingham, Alabama, Martin began playing soccer from the age of three. She played recreational soccer in the Elite Club National League before joining club side Birmingham United. In 2015, she was part of the Oak Mountain High School side which won the Class 7A state championship game while only conceding a school record six goals throughout the season. Following her senior season, Martin was named as the Birmingham Girls Soccer Player of the Year and was the number 1 ranked prospect in the state of Alabama.

Initially wanting to attend Auburn University, the alma mater of her parents, Martin was recruited by the University of Alabama to play college soccer with the Alabama Crimson Tide during her junior year. She made her debut for the Crimson Tide on August 18, 2016 against the Sam Houston State Bearkats, going on to play 19 games throughout her first collegiate season. She would go on to play a total of 76 matches during her four seasons with the Crimson Tide, scoring 5 goals, and earning the 2019 SEC Scholar Athlete of the Year award.

Racing Louisville
In February 2021, Martin began training with National Women's Soccer League club Racing Louisville during their pre-season camp. On April 5, 2021, Martin was signed by Racing Louisville. She made her professional debut for the club on April 10, 2021 in the NWSL Challenge Cup against the Orlando Pride. She appeared in 18 matches for the season, starting in 13.

Career statistics

Honors
Individual
2019 SEC Scholar Athlete of the Year

References

External links
 Profile at Racing Louisville

1998 births
Living people
American women's soccer players
Women's association football defenders
Alabama Crimson Tide women's soccer players
Racing Louisville FC players
National Women's Soccer League players
Soccer players from Birmingham, Alabama